Lady T is the second studio album by American singer-songwriter Teena Marie, released by Motown's Gordy label on February 14, 1980.

Background 

The album was produced by Richard Rudolph, and the track "Too Many Colors" features the then 7 year-old Maya Rudolph, daughter of Rudolph and his late wife Minnie Riperton.  The album was dedicated to Minnie Riperton. Lady T was the nickname of Teena Marie at Motown Records. The packaging of Teena Marie's debut album Wild and Peaceful had not included a picture of the singer, and the image on the sleeve of this album surprised many people who had assumed she was African-American.

Lady T peaked at #18 on the Black Albums chart and #45 on the Pop Albums chart. Lead single "Can It Be Love" was a minor hit on the US Black Singles chart followed by "Behind the Groove" which peaked at #21 on the US Black Singles chart and became Teena Marie's only top 20 hit in the United Kingdom, reaching #6. "Lonely Desire" was released as the final single from the album.

Track listing 
Side A
 "Behind the Groove" (Marie, Richard Rudolph) – 6:06
 "Now That I Have You" (Art Philips, Richard Rudolph, Claudia Talbott) – 5:32
 "Lonely Desire" (Marie, Richard Rudolph, Dwayne Wedlaw) – 4:39
 "Aladdin's Lamp" (Marie) – 4:55

Side B
5. "You're All the Boogie I Need" (Mickey Hearn, Marie) – 5:44
6. "Can It Be Love" (Marie, Dwayne Wedlaw) – 4:24
7. "Young Girl in Love" (Jill Jones, Marie) – 3:55
8. "Why Did I Have to Fall in Love with You" (Marie, George Sopuch) – 4:45
9. "Too Many Colors (Tee's Interlude)" (Marie) – 3:10

1991 Reissue
10. "Why Can't I Get Next to You" (Marie) – 3:58
11. "Co-Pilot to Pilot" (Marie) – 4:23

2011 Expanded Edition
10. Behind The Groove (Original LP Version) - 6:13
11. Behind The Groove (Rick James Mix) - 6:16
12. Behind The Groove (The Missing "M+M" 12-Inch Mix) - 9:13

Personnel 

Teena Marie – acoustic guitar, lead and backing vocals
Nathan Watts, Eddie Watkins, Oscar Alston on "Behind The Groove" – bass
Paulinho Da Costa – percussion
Michael Boddicker – synthesizer
Jeremy Lubbock – Fender Rhodes
Randy Waldman – Fender Rhodes, piano, synthesizer
Greg Hargrove, Tim May, Bob "Boogie" Bowles, Art Phillips – guitar
Charles A. Glenn, Jr., Eddie N. Watkins, Jr. – bass
Christopher Anthony Boehme, Paul Hines, Tony "T-Bird" Lewis – drums
Gary Grant – flugelhorn, trumpet
Kim Hutchcroft – flute, saxophone
Jerry Hey – flugelhorn, trumpet
Charles Loper – trombone
Steve Forman – percussion
Everett Bryson, Jr. – congas, percussion
James S. Stewart, Jr. – piano
Thomas "T" Bumpass – trumpet, backing vocals
William Carroll White, Jr. – saxophone, backing vocals
Larry Williams – flute, saxophone
Ray C. Woodard – saxophone, backing vocals
Bob Zimmitti – cowbell, percussion
Maya Rudolph, Dwayne Medlaw – voices
Diahnne Abbott, Brenda Lee Eager, Linda Little, Jill Jones, Bill Thedford – backing vocals

Charts

Singles

References

External links 
 Teena Marie-Lady T at Discogs

Teena Marie albums
1980 albums
Gordy Records albums